Vontez Douglas Duff (born March 8, 1982) is a former National Football League cornerback. Born and raised in Copperas Cove, Texas, Duff attended Copperas Cove High School, where he was a standout running back. He attended the University of Notre Dame from 2000–2004 and played cornerback and also frequently returned kickoffs and punts. He was drafted in the 2004 NFL Draft by the Houston Texans in the 6th round. He also played for the Chicago Bears. Duff would later go on to play for the Las Vegas Gladiators of the Arena Football League (AFL).

References

External links
Notre Dame Fighting Irish bio

1982 births
Living people
People from Copperas Cove, Texas
American football cornerbacks
Notre Dame Fighting Irish football players
Las Vegas Gladiators players
Pittsburgh Steelers players
Houston Texans players
Chicago Bears players